Vice Admiral Dick Roland Börjesson (born 16 July 1938) is a Swedish Navy officer. He was Chief of the Navy from 1990 to 1994 and military commander of the Middle Military District (Milo M) from 1994 to 1998.

Early life
Börjesson was born on 16 July 1938 in Strömstad, Sweden, the son of Arvid Börjesson and his wife Viola (née Larsson).

Career
Börjesson attended the Royal Swedish Naval Academy from 1958 to 1961. He finished first in his class at the graduation in 1961. He received a reward that was very rarely awarded, namely the Naval Academy's gold token and an honorary saber. He was commissioned as a naval officer with the rank of acting sub-lieutenant (fänrik). Börjesson was promoted to sub-lieutenant (löjtnant) in 1963 and from 1964 to 1965 he served aboard the cadet training vessel  during her trip to South America, Central America and North America. Börjesson was promoted to lieutenant in 1968 and attended the Swedish Armed Forces Staff College from 1970 to 1972 when he was promoted to lieutenant commander. Börjesson was promoted to commander in 1975 and was secretary in the 1978 Defense Committee from 1978 to 1982. Börjesson was commanding officer of the 6th Mine Clearance Department (6. minröjningsavdelningen, 6. mröjA) from 1982 to 1983 before being promoted to captain the same year. He was head of Section 1 in the Naval Staff from 1983 to 1986 and in the 1987 he completed the main course at the Swedish National Defence College and was promoted to senior captain. Börjesson was section chief in the Defence Staff from 1987 to 1989 and also in 1989 he completed the management course at the Swedish National Defence College and was promoted to rear admiral. In 1990 he was promoted to vice admiral and appointed Chief of the Navy. On 1 July 1994 he became military commander of the Middle Military District (Milo M) and Commandant General in Stockholm. Börjesson left the position and retired in 1998.

Beside his military career, Börjesson was an expert in the Swedish Coast Guard Committee (Kustbevakningskommittén) and was a board member of the National Institute of Defence Organization and Management (Försvarets rationaliseringsinstitut), Försvarsmedia, the National Maritime Museum and the Swedish National Defence College. He became a member of the Royal Swedish Society of Naval Sciences in 1979 (honorary member in 1990) and of the Royal Swedish Academy of War Sciences in 1986. In 1999, Börjesson investigated the Swedish government's crisis work following the Estonia disaster. He proposed a crisis organization in the government office. The proposal ended up in the trash bin.

Personal life
In 1962 he married the Judge of Appeal Margareta Niklason (born 1939), the daughter of Oskar Niklason and Birgit (née Forsberg).

Dates of rank
1961 – Acting sub-lieutenant
1963 – Sub-lieutenant
1968 – Lieutenant
1972 – Lieutenant commander
1975 – Commander
1983 – Captain
1987 – Senior captain
1989 – Rear admiral
1990 – Vice admiral

Awards and decorations
   Grand Cross of the Order of May (4 June 1998)

References

1938 births
Living people
Swedish Navy vice admirals
People from Strömstad Municipality
Members of the Royal Swedish Society of Naval Sciences
Members of the Royal Swedish Academy of War Sciences